The list of ship launches in 1957 includes a chronological list of all ships launched in 1957.


References

1957
Ship launches